Lee Yong-ju (born June 6, 1970) is a South Korean film director and screenwriter.

Career

Filmography 
A.F.R.I.K.A. (2002) - production dept
Memories of Murder (2003) - assistant director
Spider Forest (2004) - production dept, actor
Feathers in the Wind (2005) - actor
Holy Daddy (2006) - production dept
The Mafia, the Salesman (2007) - line producer
Possessed (2009) - director, screenwriter
Architecture 101 (2012) - director, screenwriter
The Silenced (2015) - script editor
The Himalayas (2015) - production dept
Seo Bok (2020) - Director

Awards 
2009 10th Busan Film Critics Awards: Best New Director (Possessed)
2009 30th Blue Dragon Film Awards: Best Screenplay (Possessed)
2012 12th Buil Film Awards: Best Screenplay (Architecture 101)

References

External links 
 
 
 

1970 births
Living people
South Korean film directors
South Korean screenwriters
Yonsei University alumni